Erasmus Widmann (1572–1634) was a South German composer.

Widmann was born at Schwäbisch Hall, and studied in Tübingen. His first musical positions were in Eisenerz (1595), Graz (1596), Schwäbisch Hall, and from 1602 Kapellmeister to Count Wolfgang von Hohenlohe-Weikersheim till the count's death in 1610. Finally Widmann was cantor and organist at Rothenburg ob der Tauber.

Works
A large quantity of dances and songs.
 Drei Motetten
 Die Musikalische Kurzweil (1611), modern edition Verlag C. Hofius Ammerbuch, 2012, 
 Musikalischer Tugendspiegel (1613)
 Canzonas Intradas and Galliard (1618)

Recordings
 Widmann, Erasmus: »Piorum suspiria. Andechtige Seufftzen unnd Gebet umb den lieben Frieden ...«. Rothenburg o.d.T.: Simon Halbmayer, o.J. (1629). 30 kürzere Sätze zu 3 und 4 Stimmen mit jew. etlichen Strophen. Nur die ersten 7 Sätze beziehen sich auf den Frieden, diese vierstimmig (SATB). On Friedens-Seufftzer und Jubel-Geschrey - Music for the Peace of Westphalia. Weser-Renaissance Ensemble Bremen dir. Manfred Cordes. cpo

References

External link
Katalog der Deutschen Nationalbibliothek

1572 births
1634 deaths
16th-century German composers
17th-century German composers